Chiburi Dam is a rockfill dam located in Tochigi prefecture in Japan. The dam is used for irrigation. The catchment area of the dam is 1.7 km2. The dam impounds about 5  ha of land when full and can store 354 thousand cubic meters of water. The construction of the dam was started on 1966 and completed in 1971.

References

Dams in Tochigi Prefecture
1971 establishments in Japan